Prawda is a Polish surname meaning "truth". Notable people with the surname include:

 Andrzej Prawda (1951–2020), Polish football manager
 Christian Prawda (born 1982), Austrian footballer
 Marek Prawda (born 1956), Polish diplomat

Polish-language surnames